Parini may refer to:
Battista Parini, Italian cyclist
Giuseppe Parini, Italian poet
Jay Parini, American writer and academic